Tiger Beer is a Singaporean brand of beer first launched in 1932. It is currently produced by Heineken Asia Pacific, formerly known as Asia Pacific Breweries. The company is a joint-venture between Heineken N.V. and Singaporean multinational food and beverage company Fraser and Neave.

The Tiger Brewery Tour is a tourist attraction located at the Tuas district of the country, which offers guided visits as to how the beer is brewed. According to a Brand Finance report, Tiger is amongst Singapore's top 10 most valuable brands.

Beers
Launched in 1932, Tiger beer became Singapore's first locally brewed beer.  It is a 5% abv bottled pale lager. Heineken Asia Pacific's flagship brand, it is available in more than 60 countries worldwide.

Products
The brewery produces several brands of beer.
 Tiger Beer
 Tiger Crystal
 Tiger White
 Tiger Black
 Tiger Radler Lemon

Brewery
Tiger Brewery is open for public tours and tastings.

Marketing

Advertising
The "It's Time for a Tiger" slogan for Tiger Beer has run for decades since its inception in the 1930s.

The writer Anthony Burgess named his first novel Time for a Tiger (the first part of the Malayan trilogy The Long Day Wanes) after the advertising slogan. The beer was popular in the Malaya of the 1950s, where Burgess was working.

Burgess reveals in his autobiography that, when his Time for a Tiger was published, he asked the manufacturer, then Fraser and Neave, for a complimentary clock with the Tiger beer slogan. The brewery declined to offer this or any other gift to him. But, fourteen years later, when Burgess was more famous, it relented. In 1970, the company offered Burgess the privilege to consume any of their beers free of charge while in Singapore. However, in his own words, Burgess wrote in response: "But it was too late, I had become wholly a gin man."

Sponsorships

Tiger Cup

Tiger Sky Tower

Awards
Tiger Beer has entered a number of beer tasting competitions and has performed well. At the 2011 World Quality Selections, organised by Monde Selection, the brand won a Gold Quality award.

Tiger in popular culture

Film
The beer was also seen in the 2002 movie The Transporter with Jason Statham. Crates of Tiger appeared in the 2008 film Tropic Thunder. Also, in the 2001 Hong Kong action thriller The Accidental Spy it's the preferred beer of Buck Yuen (played by Jackie Chan) who orders it by name in a bar and, also, has an empty bottle of Tiger by his bed in the next scene as he wakes up from a dream.

In the movie The Odd Angry Shot about the Australian Special Air Service during the Vietnam War, Tiger is considered the beer of choice amongst American and Aussie troops. Tiger is seen as a favourite amongst British troops during the Malayan Emergency in the film The Virgin Soldiers.

Music
In Vietnam, Tiger Beer regularly organizes music events. The first event took place in 2007 at tigermusic.com.vn. The event takes place every year.

 Tiger remix 2017 in Vietnam 
 Tiger remix 2018 in Vietnam 
 Tiger remix 2019 in Vietnam  
 Tiger remix 2020 in Vietnam

References

External links

 
 Tiger Brewery tour
 Tiger music event website in Vietnam

1932 establishments in Singapore
Beer in Singapore
Singaporean brands
Heineken brands
Beer brands
Tigers in popular culture